Delta-S is a Christian industrial/progressive trance band formed in Camarillo, California in 1995. Band members currently include Lyte, who writes and produces a bulk of the work, and Lucien, who tests the material's emotional value and authenticity.

History
Delta-S was initially formed in 1995 by artists Moe and Lyte, under the name Entropy. Later that year, the band changed their name to Delta-S. The name refers to a change in entropy (Delta So), and conceptually refers to the band's attempts at speeding up, slowing down, or stopping the process of entropy in the listener. In 1996, Jim Prosser joined the band. Work began on the production of their first album, including some collaboration with the band Calcutta and artists Duke and Joshua Vosper. The album was never released, and Delta-S disbanded in 1998.

After disbanding, Lyte continued the project as a solo effort. In 1999, production for the second Delta-S album, And Sometimes..., began. This album was also unreleased. In 2000, the band adopted a new member, Lucien, and work started on a third album, Chasm. This was released as the band's debut album in March 2005, under a created record label entitled WindM Records, titled Chasm (Volume 0). The album was later re-released as Chasm (Volume 1) in May that year.

The band released a second album, Voyage to Isis, in December 2007. The album featured several guest vocalists including Kirsty Hawkshaw and Sheri Shaw of Deitiphobia.

The band's third album, The Mortal Veil, was released on October 31, 2015. This was followed by the extended plays Lost in You, featuring Jennifer Lauren (Emoiryah) and released on October 31, 2017, and Coven, released on December 22, 2017.

Band members
Brian "Lyte" Judy – vocals, keys, guitar
Robert "Lucien" Morris – guitar, vocals
Colleen Kelly – vocals
DJ Amanda Jones – vocals
Nicki Tedesco – bass, upright bass, vocals, guitar
Tony Bandos – drums

Former members
Michael "Moe" Masingale
Jim Prosser

Collaborators
Kirsty Hawkshaw
Christina Novelli
Pamela Vain
DJ Type 41
Lauren Edman
Sheri Shaw
Nikki Williams
Michelle Averna
Ever
Anguidara
Tranquil Chaos
David Pataconi
Emoiryah
LAKE

Discography 
Chasm (2005, WindM Records)
Voyage to Isis (2007, WindM Records)
The Mortal Veil (2015, WindM Records)
Lost in You (2017, WindM Records)
Mirror Dimension Series Vol. 1: Coven (2017, WindM Records)

Compilation appearances
Automata 9.0 (2006, Flaming Fish) – "Rage Into Blindness" 
Automata 10.0 (2006, Flaming Fish) – "Tempest"

Remixes
 2007: Celldweller – "Frozen" (Fade to Grey Mix by Delta-S)
 2007: Celldweller – "Frozen" (Anomaly Mix by Delta-S)

Collaborations
 2014: Delta-S & Christina Novelli – "Alive"

References

External links 
Delta-S website
Delta-S Myspace page
Automatapedia article on Delta-S
Delta-S SoundClick artist page

American industrial music groups
Musical groups from California
American Christian musical groups
American trance music groups
Musical groups established in 1995